Arimalam block is a Revenue block in Pudukkottai district, Tamil Nadu, India. It has a total of 32 panchayat villages.

Villages of Arimalam block
1.	Ayingudi 
2.	Embal  
3.	Irrumbaanadu  
4.	K.chettypatti  
5.	K.rayavaram  
6.	Kadayakudi  
7.	Kadiyapatti  
8.	Kalikulanvayal  
9.	Kallur, Pudukkottai 
10.	Kannankarangudi  
11.	Karamangalam  
12.	Keelapanaiyur  
13.	Kummankudi  
14.	Kurungalore  
15.	Madagam  
16.	Melnilaivayal  
17.	Mirattunilai  
18.	Munasandai  
19.	Nallambalsamuthitram  
20.	Nedungudi  
21.	Onangudi  
22.	Perungudi, Pudukkottai 
23.	Piliyavayal  
24.	Pudunilaivayal  
25.	Samuthiram, Pudukkottai 
26.	Sengeerai  
27.	Thekkattur  
28.	Thiruvakkudi  
29.	Thuraiyur, Pudukkottai 
30.	Valaramanikam  
31.	Vanniyampatti

References 

 

Revenue blocks of Pudukkottai district